The 1951 Polish Speedway season was the 1951 season of motorcycle speedway in Poland.

Individual

Polish Individual Speedway Championship
The 1951 Individual Speedway Polish Championship was held in Wrocław on 14 October 1951.

Team

Team Speedway Polish Championship
The 1951 Team Speedway Polish Championship was the fourth edition of the Team Polish Championship.

Rules
In First League, matches were played ona on eleg basis only. Teams were made up of 6 riders and 2 reserves. Heat scoring was: 3–2–1–0 and matches consisted of 9 heats. For winning a match a team received 2 points. The rider from a main squad started in a match three times. The quantity of small points was added up.

Before the season the Main Commission of Physical Education (Polish: Główna Komisja Kultury Fizycznej, GKKF) and Sport' Commission of Polish Motor Union selected ten teams to establish the league:
 six teams who representatives of Sport Unions of Professional Associations (Zrzeszenia Sportowych Związków Zawodowych): Unia Leszno, Budowlani Warszawa, Ogniwo Bytom, Górnik Rybnik, Stal Ostrów Wlkp. and Kolejarz Rawicz,
 one team who representatives of Army: CWKS Warszawa,
 one team who representatives of Police: Gwardia Bydgoszcz after Race-Off,
 two other teams: Włókniarz Częstochowa and Spójnia Wrocław.

On 23 April 1951 in Rzeszów Police' Speedway Clubs played Race-Off. Gwardia Bydgoszcz won and qualified to the league. In this event  Gwardia Poznań and Gwardia Rzeszow played.

First League 

Medalists

References

Poland Individual
Poland Team
Speedway